Birnam is a rural locality in the Scenic Rim Region, Queensland, Australia.

Geography 
The eastern border of Birnam is marked by the Albert River.  The locality is relatively undeveloped, with a few farms in the east.  In the north west the slopes of Mount Dunsinane rise to around 300 m.

The Beaudesert–Beenleigh Road runs through from south to north-east.

History
Birnam State School opened on 17 October 1929 and closed on 1937.

The locality contained 44 households, in which 51.9% of the population were males and 48.1% of the population were females with a median age of 45, 7 years above the national average. The average weekly household income was $1,889, $461 above the national average.

Education 
There are no schools in Birnam. The nearest government primary schools are Beaudesert State School in neighbouring  Beaudesert to the south-west and Veresdale Scrub State School in neighbouring Veresdale Scrub to the north-west. The nearest government secondary school is Beaudesert State High School in Beaudesert.

References 

Scenic Rim Region
Localities in Queensland